Damon House may refer to:

Damon House (Arlington, Massachusetts)
Isaac Damon House, part of the Parsons, Shepherd, and Damon Houses Historic District, Northampton, Massachusetts
Joseph Damon House, Reading, Massachusetts
Washington Damon House, Reading, Massachusetts
George Damon House, Madison, Ohio, listed on the National Register of Historic Places
Lowell Damon House, Wauwatosa, Wisconsin